Dead Body Road is an American comic book series created by writer Justin Jordan and artist Matteo Scalera. It was announced at the 2013 San Diego Comic-Con by Skybound Entertainment as a collaboration with Image Comics, and began publication in December of the same year. A trade paperback collecting the series was released in June 2014.

Plot summary
Orson Gage is out for revenge. Already damaged from a destructive career as lawman, Gage is going from broken to shattered as his wife is gunned down in a bank heist gone wrong. While the criminal gang that pulled it off is busy fighting amongst themselves about the blood-soaked rewards of their take, Gage is only looking for one thing: retribution.

Bad Blood 
A sequel miniseries was released in 2020, titled Dead Body Road: Bad Blood, which follows Bree Hale trying to save her brother from local crime boss Monk Sinclair. It ran for 6 issues from June to December 2020.

Collected editions

Reception 
According to review aggregator Comic Book Roundup, the first trade paperback received an average score of 8.3/10 based on 70 individual reviews of the collected single issues. The sequel series' trade paperback received an average score of 7.9/10 based on 26 individual reviews of the six issues.

External links 
Dead Body Road at Skybound
Dead Body Road at Image Comics

References

Skybound Entertainment titles
Image Comics titles
2013 comics debuts
2014 comics endings
Comics about revenge
Image Comics limited series